Tami L. Reller (born 1963 or 1964) is an American businesswoman. Reller is a native of Grand Forks, North Dakota. She earned a bachelor's degree in mathematics from Minnesota State University Moorhead and a master's degree in business administration from Saint Mary's College of California. In 1984, while still attending college, she began her career at Great Plains Software. She joined Microsoft Corporation in 2001 as part of the acquisition of Great Plains Software, where she served as a chief financial officer (CFO). In 2011, after the departure of Steven Sinofsky, she was promoted to the corporate vice president and the CFO of the company's Windows division. In July 2013, she was promoted to executive vice president, marketing for Microsoft Corporation.

In March 2014, Reller left Microsoft.

References

Microsoft employees
Women corporate executives
American women business executives
Minnesota State University Moorhead alumni
Saint Mary's College of California alumni
1960s births
Living people
20th-century American businesspeople
20th-century American businesswomen
21st-century American businesspeople
21st-century American businesswomen